Calvin Joseph Favron (July 3, 1957 – April 19, 1999) was a former American football linebacker for the St. Louis Cardinals of the National Football League (NFL). He was drafted by the Cardinals in the second round of the 1979 NFL Draft. He played college football at Southeastern Louisiana.

Professional career
The St. Louis Cardinals selected Favron in the second round (46th overall) of the 1979 NFL Draft. He was the eighth linebacker selected in 1979 and was the highest draft pick ever selected from Southeastern Louisiana. His teammate Donald Dykes was selected in the third round (68th overall) in the 1979 NFL Draft, making it the only instance Southeastern Louisiana had multiple players selected in a single NFL Draft.

Throughout his four-year stint with the St. Louis Cardinals, he played mainly on special teams. He played in 50 games and started 21 games from 1979-1982.

Later life and death
He died on April 19, 1999, in Baton Rouge, Louisiana.

References

1957 births
1999 deaths
Players of American football from Louisiana
American football linebackers
Southeastern Louisiana Lions football players
Arizona Cardinals players
St. Louis Cardinals (football) players